Mezmar or mizmar ( al-mizmar) is a traditional group performance and stick song-dance that is performed by communities that have migrated to Alhijaz region, western Saudi Arabia in the past few centuries, thus it is not considered part of the original culture of Hejaz nor its tribal native population. Almezmar is performed by about 15–100 practitioners in festive occasions such as wedding and national events, they twirl long sticks (bamboo cane), beat drums and clap to songs that can pertain to a variety of topics such as heroism, praise, chivalry, love and generosity. In the past, the ritual was associated with battle or competition. It closely resembles the tahtib dance practiced in Egypt and Sudan.

'Mizmar' is actually the generic term for almost any wind instrument found in the Hijaz or Asir, from the end-blown flute to the dual-piped boos. But the name of the art mizmar is confusing because the mizmar song-dance does not call for any wind instrument—there is no mizmar in mizmar, just drums." 

In 2016, Almezmar was inscribed on the UNESCO's Representative List of the Intangible Cultural Heritage of Humanity, considered as cultural expression representing the community identity.

Performance 
Performing Almezmar (mizmar) involves a group of men standing in two facing lines or in a large circle holding a stick, and when the drums start beating, the leader of each line begins to clap and chant loudly rhythmic songs called "zumaal" or "mizmar." The first row of men repeats the song with a strong clapping, and then the second line sings antiphonally.

See also 
 Middle Eastern dance
 Ardah
 Yowlah

References

External links
 Mizmar performance in Rabigh
 Mizmar performance in Jeddah in 1996
 Drums with dance 

Arab dance
Group dances
Intangible Cultural Heritage of Humanity
Saudi Arabian culture
Middle Eastern dances
Hejaz